Niall Cameron (born 1979) is a Scottish table tennis player from Elgin, Scotland.

He is currently ranked number 3 in Scotland.

Career
He represented Scotland in the 2002 Commonwealth Games in Manchester and the 2014 Commonwealth Games in Glasgow.

4x Scottish Men's Doubles Champion
2x Scottish Mixed Doubles Champion
Commonwealth Championships Team Bronze (2013)
British Premier League Winner (2011)

Niall has competed at four World Championships and six European Championships. Most recently, in 2019 where he faced Truls Moregard (Sweden)

External links
 Go Scotland 2014 Commonwealth Games web page

References

Living people
1979 births
Scottish table tennis players
Table tennis players at the 2002 Commonwealth Games
Table tennis players at the 2014 Commonwealth Games
British male table tennis players
Commonwealth Games competitors for Scotland